Celeste Ann Wallander (born 1961) is an American international relations advisor who currently serves as assistant secretary of defense for international security affairs at the United States Department of Defense.

Education 
Wallander received her B.A. summa cum laude in political science from Northwestern University in 1983. She received her M.A. (1985), M.Phil. (1986) and Ph.D. (1990) degrees in political science from Yale University.

Career 
Wallander was previously a professor of government at Harvard University (1989–2000), senior fellow at the Council on Foreign Relations (2000–2001), director and senior fellow of the Russia and Eurasia Program at the Center for Strategic and International Studies (2001–2006), and visiting professor at Georgetown University (2006–2008). Wallander founded the Program on New Approaches to Russian Security and the Eurasian Strategy Project.

Wallander was special assistant to the president and senior director for Russia and Eurasia on the National Security Council from 2013 to 2017. Earlier in the Obama Administration she served as the deputy assistant secretary of defense for Russia/Ukraine/Eurasia at the Office of the Under Secretary of Defense for Policy from May 2009 to July 2012. Wallander was an adviser to Barack Obama during the 2008 Democratic primary campaign.

Biden administration
On June 22, 2021, President Joe Biden nominated Wallander to be an assistant secretary of defense for international security affairs. Hearings were held before the Senate Armed Services Committee on January 13, 2022. The committee favorably reported her nomination to the Senate floor on February 1, 2022. Wallander was confirmed by the entire Senate by a vote of 83–13 on February 16, 2022.

Publications
(co-editor) Swords and sustenance : the economics of security in Belarus and Ukraine. MA: MIT Press, 2004. 
(co-editor) The sources of Russian foreign policy after the Cold War. Boulder, Colo.: Westview Press, 1996. 
Mortal friends, best enemies: German-Russian cooperation after the Cold War. Ithaca, NY: Cornell University Press, 1999. 
(co-editor) Imperfect unions: security institutions over time and space. Oxford; New York: Clarendon Press, 1999.

See also
Department of Defense appointments by Joe Biden

References

Sources 
Rocket Science 101
Biography from the United States Department of Defense
Interview with Radio Free Europe
NATO's Price: Shape Up or Ship Out (2002) - article in Foreign Affairs magazine

External links

Living people
1961 births
United States Department of Defense officials
American women political scientists
American political scientists
Northwestern University alumni
Yale Graduate School of Arts and Sciences alumni
Harvard University faculty
American women academics
Obama administration personnel
Biden administration personnel
United States Assistant Secretaries of Defense